Dendrobium amboinense, the Amboin Island dendrobium, is an ephemeral flowering lowland species of orchid in the subtribe Dendrobiinae.

The species is endemic to the island of Ambon and nearby islands in the Banda Sea, in Indonesia.

Description

The flowers, up to four per inflorescence, are produced on very short racemes. Both leafless and leaved pseudobulbs are capable of producing an inflorescence. The sepals and petals droop producing a distinctly wispy appearance.

Flowers open at night and are completely closed by the following sundown. Freshly opened flowers are bone white, and as the afternoon progresses the color slowly changes to a pale shade of burnished orange.

See also

List of Dendrobium species

References

amboinense
Endemic orchids of Indonesia
Plants described in 1856
Taxa named by William Jackson Hooker